Lindsay Hassett was the vice-captain and one of three on-tour selectors for Don Bradman's famous Australian cricket team, which toured England in 1948. The Australians went undefeated in their 34 matches; this unprecedented feat by a Test side touring England earned them the sobriquet The Invincibles, and resulted in them being regarded as one of the greatest teams of all time. A right-handed batsman, Hassett played in all five Tests; he was a middle-order batsman in all but the Fourth Test, when he stood in as an opener due to an injury to Sid Barnes.

As the matches were often played consecutively without a day between fixtures, Australia employed a rotation policy, and as a result, Hassett captained the team in nine tour matches while Bradman was rested. Under Hassett's watch, Australia won seven matches, five of these by an innings, while both draws were rain-affected fixtures in which more than half the playing time was lost. Hassett had two close encounters, both on damp pitches before the First Test. Against Yorkshire, Australia scraped home by four wickets in a low-scoring match with ten men after Sam Loxton succumbed to injury. In a later match against Hampshire, Australia ceded a first innings lead for the first time on tour, but recovered to win by eight wickets.

Hassett ended the first-class matches with 1,563 runs at a batting average of 74.22 including seven centuries. Among the Australians, he had the third highest aggregate behind Bradman and Arthur Morris and the second highest average. His highest score was an unbeaten 200 against the Gentlemen of England. Hassett was less successful in the Tests, scoring 310 runs at 44.28 with one century. This placed him fourth in the Australian aggregates, but only seventh in the averages. His biggest contribution was his 137 in the first innings of the First Test at Trent Bridge. It was a patient innings as England attempted to stop Australia's scoring with defensive leg theory; Hassett helped the tourists set up a first innings lead of 344, which laid the foundation for the eventual victory. He had three scores between 35 and 50 during the Tests, but was unable to convert his starts into large innings. Hassett took 23 catches on the tour, the most by an Australia excluding wicket-keepers.

Hassett was named as one of the five Wisden Cricketers of the Year for 1949. Wisden remarked that "in addition to his playing ability Hassett's cheerfulness and leadership, which extended to off-the-field relaxation as well as in the more exacting part of the programme, combined to make him an ideal vice-captain able to lift a considerable load off Bradman's busy shoulders".

Background 
The 1948 tour was Hassett's second Test campaign in England. A diminutive right-handed batsman, he toured England under Bradman in 1938, making his Test debut during the series and playing in all four matches. Following the interruption of World War II, Hassett led the Australian Services—a military team—in the Victory Tests. He became a regular member of the Test team and was the vice-captain under Bradman for the series against England and India in Australia during 1946–47 and 1947–48 respectively. In the latter Test series, he averaged 110.66 with the bat, and he was duly selected for the tour of England, continuing in his role as Bradman's deputy.

Early tour 
Australia traditionally fielded its first-choice team in the tour opener, which was customarily against Worcestershire. Hassett thus played as vice-captain of Bradman's first-choice team and took a catch as Australia dismissed the hosts for 233. However, when Australia batted, Bradman rearranged the order and Hassett came in at No.7 with Australia's score at 5/320 after losing 4/55 in a middle-order collapse. Hassett made 25 in 66 minutes with three fours as Australia declared at 8/462; the hosts were bowled out for 212 to complete an Australian victory by an innings and 17 runs. Hassett was rested for next match against Leicestershire, which resulted in another innings win for the tourists.

The Australians then proceeded to play Yorkshire at Bradford, on a damp pitch that suited slower bowling; rain delayed the start of the match until midway through the first afternoon. Bradman rested himself and returned to London while Hassett led the team. Yorkshire elected to bat and were bowled out in difficult batting conditions for 71, despite Australia losing all rounder Sam Loxton with a hamstring injury. Australia replied with 101 without Loxton, who was unable to bat. Hassett came in at 1/24 and was immediately out for a duck. Australia then bowled out the hosts in the second innings for 89. Chasing 60 for victory, Hassett elected to not ask for the pitch to be rolled. Former Australian Test batsman Jack Fingleton said Hassett "might have made an initial mistake in not having the pitch rolled because whenever there was rain about in England the heavy roller seemed to knock any nonsense [erratic bounce and sideways movement] out of the pitch". Australia lost quick wickets and Hassett came in with the score at 2/5. Keith Miller was then out at 3/13 after attempting to hit a six, while Hassett was nervous after his first innings duck. Ron Hamence joined Hassett and they took the score to 20 before the former was run out attempting a quick single. Without further addition to the score, Hassett attempted a pull shot and top edged it so high that five players had the time to converge and any of these could have caught the ball. The catch was eventually taken directly in front of Hassett, leaving Australia at 5/20. To make matters worse, Loxton was still too injured to bat, so Australia effectively had only four wickets in hand and faced its first loss to an English county since 1912. Neil Harvey had scored a solitary run when he was dropped at short leg. Colin McCool fell at 6/31, and Harvey and new partner Don Tallon were both given lives before the tourists scraped home by four wickets. It was the closest Australia came to defeat for the whole tour, and Hassett was very relieved, playing his head in his hands and muttering "Why me? Why is it always me?" in a reference to his encountering rain-affected wickets as captain.

Bradman returned to lead the Australians in the next match against Surrey at The Oval in London; Australia won the toss and batted first. Sid Barnes and Arthur Morris put on 136, before Bradman and Barnes put on another 207 before the opener fell for 176. Hassett came in and Bradman was dismissed for 146 at 3/403. Hassett struck form and reached his first century for the English summer, posting 110 before being clean bowled by Test seamer Alec Bedser as Australia were bowled out for 632. Bedser pitched an outswinger on leg stump and it moved away to clip Hassett's off stump. Bradman's men then bowled Surrey out for 141 and 195 to win by an innings.

Bradman rested himself for the next match against Cambridge University, and Hassett led the tourists to another innings victory after the hosts won the toss and elected to bat. After Cambridge had made 167, Hassett scored an unbeaten 61 in a partnership of 140 with Bill Brown before declaring at 4/414 when Brown fell for 200. Hassett's bowlers then dismissed the hosts for 196 in the second innings, sealing victory by an innings and 51 runs. In the following match against Essex, Bradman returned and Hassett was rested as Australia won the toss and batted first, scoring a world-record of 721 first-class runs in one day. The visitors then proceeded to victory by an innings and 451 runs, their biggest winning margin for the summer. Bradman then rested himself for the next game against Oxford University, where Hassett oversaw another innings victory. Hassett made a duck, caught from a rearing ball from paceman Philip Whitcombe, as Australia made 431 and then enforced the follow on.

The next match was against the Marylebone Cricket Club (MCC) at Lord's. The MCC fielded seven players who would represent England in the Tests, and were basically a full-strength Test team, while Australia selected their first-choice team. Bradman captained the team and batted at No.3 with Hassett in his customary position at No.4. Barring one change in the bowling department, the same team would line up for Australia in the First Test, with the top six batsmen in the same position. It was a chance for players from both sides to gain a psychological advantage before the Tests. Australia elected to bat and Hassett came in to join Bradman at 2/171. The pair took the score to 200 before Bradman fell for 98 to leave Australia at 3/200. Hassett then put on 80 with Miller before being trapped leg before wicket (lbw) for 51 by Jack Young. Fingleton hailed Hassett's display as "the prettiest half century we saw in the whole summer. There was not effort in his play. The ball sped quietly and quickly in all directions." Bradman's men went on to amass 552 and bowled out the hosts for 189 and 205 to win by an innings, with Hassett catching Len Hutton and Ken Cranston in the first innings.

The MCC match was followed by Australia's first non-victory of the tour, which was against Lancashire. Hassett was rested as the first day was washed out and the match ended in a draw. In the following match against Nottinghamshire, the hosts batted first and made 179. Hassett made 44 and featured in a partnership of 81 with Keith Miller as the tourists reached 400. However, Nottinghamshire ended at 8/299 to hang on for a draw in the second innings. Bradman rested himself for the following match against Hampshire, and Hassett oversaw another scare. On a drying pitch, Australia were dismissed for 117 in reply to the home side's 195, the first time they had conceded a first innings lead on tour. Australia had made a solid start, reaching 2/70 before Hassett fell for 26, sparking a collapse of 8/47 to be all out for 117. This prompted Bradman to telegram Hassett: "Bradford was bad enough but this is unbearable, heads up and chins down." Hampshire were then bowled out for 103, leaving Australia a target of 182, which they reached to seal an eight-wicket win, with Hassett unbeaten on 27. The final match before the First Test was against Sussex. Hassett was rested as Australia skittled the hosts for 86 and declared at 5/549, before completing another innings victory.

First Test 

Australia headed into the First Test at Trent Bridge with ten wins and two draws from twelve tour matches, including eight innings victories. England captain Norman Yardley won the toss and elected to bat. Pundits predicted that the pitch would be ideal for batting after offering some assistance to fast bowlers in the first hour. The surface had greened up following overnight rain. Australia's fast bowlers reduced England to 8/74 before finishing them off for 165 late on the first day. The tourists had already taken the lead by the time Hassett came in to join Bradman at 4/185 on the second afternoon. The hard-hitting Miller had come in at No.4, the more Hassett's usual position, indicating that Bradman may have been looking to attack, but the change in batting order failed as Miller was out for a duck.

Australia had been scoring slowly, as they would throughout the day, and following Hassett's entrance, the Australians slowed further as Bradman changed the team strategy to one of attempting to bat only once. Hassett almost holed out early when he knocked a ball from Alec Bedser up in the air and it just evaded the grasp of wicket-keeper Godfrey Evans. Yardley continued to employ leg theory, as he and Charlie Barnett bowled outside leg stump; this tactic stifled the Australian scoring but also limited wicket-taking opportunities. During one over, Bradman did not attempt to hit a single ball and put his hands on his hips to express his displeasure at England's tactics. During the 15 minutes before tea, the Australian skipper did not add a single run and was heckled by the crowd. In the last session, Bradman brought up one of his slowest ever centuries, as Yardley focused on stopping runs rather than taking Australian wickets. Bradman reached stumps on 130. Hassett also batted patiently, with one period of 20 minutes during which his score remained on 30. Australia closed the second day at 4/293 to lead by 128, with Hassett on 41, having combined for an unbroken stand of 108 with Bradman.

Early on the third day, Bradman fell for 138 with the score at 5/305. Yardley again pinned Hassett down with more leg theory. Laker bowled with one slip, while Young had none and employed a pure ring field. The scoring was slow during this passage of play—Young delivered 11 consecutive maiden overs and his 26-over spell conceded only 14 runs. In the face of the slow proceedings, Hassett conducted himself in a humorous way, and English commentator John Arlott said that "only his grace and concealed humour made his innings tolerable". He mainly scored from deflections and was for the most part prepared to take his time. The injured Ray Lindwall came out to join Hassett at 7/365 without a runner. Hassett—who had scored only 30 runs in the first 75 minutes of the morning—swept Laker for four and then hit him for the first six of the match. Hassett added 53 in the two hours of the morning session to reach lunch at 94. Australia were unhurried and remained patient in the face of Yardley's defensive tactics because they had bowled England out on the first day and there was still sufficient time to force a result. After the break, Hassett reached his first Test century on English soil. from 305 minutes. He then accelerated, adding a further 37 runs in 49 minutes, before being bowled by Bedser, having struck 20 fours and a six. This ended an eighth-wicket partnership of 107 with Lindwall with the score at 8/473; Australia ended at 509 to take a 344-run first innings lead.

During England's second innings, Joe Hardstaff, Jr. fell for 43, lofting Ernie Toshack to Hassett on the leg side to end a partnership of 93 with Denis Compton. The ball looped up in the air and travelled half-way to the square leg boundary, but Hassett managed to keep track of its trajectory through the fog. Australia eventually finished off the hosts for 441, leaving them a target of 98 on the final afternoon. Australia proceeded steadily to 38 from 32 minutes before Morris fell. Bradman came in and was out for a duck. This left Australia at 2/48, at which point dark clouds began to close in on the ground, and it appeared that rain might save England. However, it never came, and meanwhile Hassett joined Barnes. The pair attacked, Hassett twice driving Bedser over the infield for boundaries, and later pulling another ball in the air for another four. The tourists reached the target without further loss after 87 minutes of batting. Barnes tied the scores with a swept boundary, but ran off the field with a souvenir stump, believing that the match was over. He returned to the field when he noticed the crowd reaction; Hassett hit the winning run to end with an unbeaten 21.

Between Tests, Bradman rested himself for the match against Northamptonshire, which started the day after the Test. Hassett won the toss and elected to bowl; his bowlers ensured that the decision paid off by bowling out the hosts for 119. When Australia batted, Hassett came in at 1/17 and added 122 runs for the second wicket with Morris before combining for another 104 with Ron Hamence. Hassett was eventually out for the top score of 127, having played with flair and freedom he eschewed in the Tests, before Australia declared at 8/352. The bowlers then removed Northamptonshire for 169, giving Australia a victory by an innings and 64 runs. Hassett also took five catches for the match. He was rested for the second match against Yorkshire, which was drawn.

Second Test 

Australia opted to field an unchanged lineup for the Second Test at Lord's. Bradman elected to bat, allowing Lindwall more time to recover from a groin strain before being required to bowl. Hassett came in to join Morris at 2/87 when Bradman fell soon after lunch on the first day. The new ball was available, but England had declined to take it. Bedser beat Hassett second ball with a delivery that moved back in, but the appeal for lbw was turned down. However, Yardley opted to not take the ball, and Hassett managed to score a single and get off strike before the English captain finally called for a replacement ball. Journalist and retired Australian cricketer Bill O'Reilly said that the failure to take the new ball immediately after the appeal was a failure to maximise the psychological pressure on Hassett.

The pair added 79 before Morris fell for 105 and Miller was out seven runs later at 4/173. By taking two quick wickets, England had put the match back in the balance. Batting out of position in the middle order, Brown came in and helped Hassett to rebuild the innings. Both scored slowly, averaging more than three and half minutes for each run. Hassett was dropped three times before Yardley, who was bowling mainly in order to allow his frontline bowlers to recuperate, broke through his defences with a yorker, dismissing him for 47 after 175 minutes of batting; the English skipper trapped Brown lbw nine runs later to leave Australia 6/225. Australia recovered to 350 on the second morning, and England were then bowled out on the third morning for 215. Australia's top-order scored quickly and Hassett came in with the score at 2/296 after 277 minutes of batting. Yardley bowled Hassett first ball off the inside edge, so Miller came to the crease at 3/296 to face the hat-trick ball. Miller survived a loud lbw appeal to deny the English captain a hat-trick. Australia then declared at 7/460 on the fourth day to leave England a target of 596, which would have taken a world record run-chase for victory. Hassett caught Alec Bedser from the bowling of Bill Johnston as Australia bowled out the hosts for 186 early on the final morning to win by 409 runs.

The next match was against Surrey and started the day after the Lord's Test. Australia elected to field and dismissed the hosts for 221. Brown injured a finger while fielding and was unable to bat in Australia's first innings. Hamence filled in as an opener alongside Hassett but was out for a duck, so Bradman joined his deputy with the score at 1/6. The Australian skipper put on 231 with Hassett, who top-scored with 139. Accelerating after reaching his century, Hassett was out for 4/289 and the tourists collapsed to be all out for 389, after losing 7/100. In the second innings, Australia's makeshift openers Harvey and Sam Loxton chased down the 122 runs required for a 10-wicket win in less than hour, so Hassett was not required to bat.

Bradman rested himself for the following match against Gloucestershire before the Third Test. Hassett led the team and elected to bat as Australia reached 7/774 declared on the second day. It was the tourists' highest score for the tour and the second best by any Australian team on English soil. Hassett instructed his batsmen to attack local off spinner Tom Goddard, who was seen as a possible selection for England in the Third Test. His batsmen used their feet to charge at Goddard, who was used to batsmen playing him from static positions, and could not cope. Goddard took 0/186 from 32 overs and his chances of being selected ended. However, Hassett was unable to join the plunder, making only 21. He then enforced the follow on as the hosts were out for 279 and 132 to cede victory by an innings and 363 runs. Hassett allowed himself to bowl for the first time on tour, sending down two overs for eight runs without taking a wicket.

Third Test 

The teams reassembled at Old Trafford for the Third Test. Australia replaced Brown—who had scored 73 runs at 24.33 in three innings— with the all rounder Loxton, who had made an unbeaten 47 against Surrey and 159 not out against Gloucestershire. England made 363 after electing to bat. On the second day, Australia were in trouble when Hassett came in at 2/13. Morris and Hassett rebuilt the innings, adding 69 for the third wicket in 101 minutes before the latter was beaten in flight by Jack Young. Aiming to break Young's restrictive leg side bowling, Hassett charged down the pitch and lofted a drive for four. However, in attempting a similar lofted drive over cover, he mishit the ball, which was caught by Cyril Washbrook at wide mid-off. This left Australia at 3/82 and they eventually made 221 to avoid the follow on by eight runs.

In England's second innings, Lindwall bounced Washbrook and the England opener went for the hook shot. The ball flew in the air straight towards fine leg, where Hassett dropped the ball on the third attempt. At the time, Washbrook was on 21. The English batsman had moved to 78 when he again hooked Lindwall to long leg and was again dropped by Hassett. The Australian vice-captain responded by borrowing a helmet from a nearby policeman before humorously gesturing to indicate that he was ready for the next catch, much to the amusement of the crowd. On 80, Washbrook was dropped in the slips cordon by Johnson from the bowling of Toshack. After the day's play, Washbrook shouted Hassett a drink; England were in a strong position at 3/174, with an overall lead of 316. Luckily for Australia, the pair of missed chances from the England opener late in the day cost little. Washbrook remained unbeaten on 85 as England declared without further addition to their score midway through the last day; the entire fourth day and the final morning had been lost to rain. Hassett was not required as Australia batted for 61 overs to reach 1/92 and ensure that the match ended in a draw.

After Old Trafford, Hassett was rested as Australia defeated Middlesex by ten wickets in their only county match between Tests.

Fourth Test 

The teams then headed to Headingley for the Fourth Test. Australia made two changes. Neil Harvey replaced the injured Barnes, while Ron Saggers replaced Don Tallon—who had a finger injury—behind the stumps. The reserve opener Brown was not recalled to open in the absence of Barnes; instead, Hassett would improvise and open with Morris, while the teenaged Harvey came into the middle-order. As Australia led 2–0 after three Tests, England needed to win the last two matches to square the series. The home team won the toss and elected to bat on a batsman-friendly pitch. Hassett dropped Len Hutton—who went on to score 81—on 25. England's first-wicket partnership was broken at 168 and was their first opening stand beyond 42 for the series. The hosts were eventually out for 496 on the second day. Hassett caught England wicket-keeper Godfrey Evans, who meekly prodded a ball from Sam Loxton straight to silly mid-on.

With Barnes injured, Hassett moved from the middle-order to open the innings with Morris. Bedser removed Morris for six to leave Australia at 1/13, bringing Bradman to the crease.
Hassett batted in a restrained manner, while Bradman attacked. The Australian captain was 31 and his deputy 13 as the tourists reached stumps at 1/63. Bradman did the majority of the scoring during the closing stages of the afternoon, adding 31 in a partnership of 50. On the third morning, play resumed in hot and humid conditions. In the second over delivered by Dick Pollard, the bowler made the second ball lift unexpectedly. Hassett was unable to get out of the way and edged the ball to Jack Crapp for 13. Bradman was out in the same over and Australia were in trouble at 3/68, but they recovered after a middle-order counterattack took them to 458 early on the fourth day. Hassett then caught Bedser during England's second innings.

England declared at 8/365 after two overs on the last day. Batting into the final day allowed Yardley to ask the groundsman to use a heavy roller, which would help to break up the wicket and make it more likely to spin. Bradman elected to not have the pitch rolled at all, demonstrating his belief that such a device would only make batting more difficult.

Yardley's declaration left Australia to chase 404 runs for victory. At the time, this would have been the highest ever fourth innings score to result in a Test victory for the batting team. Australia had only 345 minutes to reach the target; the local press wrote them off and predicted that they would be dismissed by lunchtime on a deteriorating wicket that was expected to favour the spin bowlers. Morris and Hassett started slowly, scoring only six runs in the first six overs on a surface that offered spin and bounce. It appeared that they were playing carefully at first before deciding whether to try and achieve the target at a later point. Only 44 runs came in the first hour, meaning that 360 runs were still needed in 285 minutes. Evans then missed a leg-side stumping opportunity against Hassett as Bedser beat both openers with extra bounce. Hassett was dismissed by Compton's left-arm unorthodox spin for 17 with the score at 57. The Englishman's delivery had caught Hassett's leading edge and he dived forward in his follow through to take a one-handed catch just above the ground. Bradman joined Morris with 347 runs needed in 257 minutes. The English spinners created a number of chances against both batsmen, but multiple catches and stumping opportunities were fumbled. Aside from the missed wicket-taking opportunities, the spinners were erratic in line and length and Bradman and Morris plundered many boundaries. Australia went on to complete the world record chase with seven wickets and 15 minutes in hand, ensuring an unassailable 3–0 series lead.

Hassett was rested as Australia amassed 456 and defeated Derbyshire by an innings immediately after the Fourth Test. He then led the team in place of the resting Bradman in the next match against Glamorgan, a rain-affected draw that did not reach the second innings. The hosts fell for 197 and Hassett was unbeaten on 71 as Australia reached 3/215—having featured in a partnership of 126 with Miller—when the weather ended the match.

In response to the home side's 138, Hassett top-scored with 68 in Australia's first innings of 254 before being trapped leg before wicket by Eric Hollies as the tourists defeated Warwickshire by nine wickets. Hollies's 8/107 was the best innings bowling figures against the Australians for the summer. The feat earned him selection for the Fifth Test, where he dismissed Bradman in his final Test innings for a duck.

Hassett was then rested as Australia faced and drew with Lancashire for the second time on the tour. Bradman then rested himself and Hassett captained in the non-first-class match against Durham, a rain-affected draw that did not reach the second innings. Hassett made three while batting at No.8 as Australia made 282 and then had the hosts at 5/73 when rain washed out the match after the first day.

Fifth Test 

Australia then headed to The Oval for the Fifth Test. Barnes returned from injury, so Hassett returned to his customary position in the middle order. England elected to bat on a rain-affected pitch. Propelled by Lindwall's 6/20, the tourists skittled Yardley's men for 52 in 42.1 overs on the first afternoon. With the score at 1/10, Bill Edrich attempted to hook a short ball from Bill Johnston. Edrich failed to get the ball in the middle of the bat and it looped up and travelled around 10m. Hassett caught the ball just behind square leg, diving sideways to get two hands to the ball. Soon after, Lindwall bounced Compton, resulting in an edge that appeared to be heading towards the slips cordon. However, the ball cleared the ring of Australian fielders. Hutton called Compton through for a run, but his surprised partner was too busy watching the ball and dropped his bat in panic. Luckily for Compton, the ball went to Hassett at third man, who waited for Compton to regain his bat and composure before returning the ball, thereby forfeiting the opportunity to effect the run out. However, Compton made only four before being dismissed, so Australia lost little from Hassett's sportsmanship.

In contrast, Australia batted with apparent ease, as the overcast skies cleared and sun came out late on the first afternoon. The opening partnership had reached 117 before Hollies removed Barnes for 61. This brought Bradman to the crease shortly before 18:00. As Bradman had announced that the tour would be his last at international level, the innings would be his last at Test level if Australia batted only once. With 6,996 Test career runs, he needed only four runs to average 100.00 in Test cricket. On the second ball, Hollies bowled Bradman for a duck with a googly that went between bat and pad as the Australian skipper leaned forward. Bradman appeared stunned and slowly turned around and walked back to the pavilion, receiving another large round of applause.

Hassett came in with the score at 2/117 and together with Morris saw Australia to the close at 2/153. Morris was unbeaten on 77 and Hassett 10. The next day, the pair took the score to 226 before their 109-run stand was broken when Young trapped Hassett lbw for 37 after 134 minutes of batting. As the Australians had dismissed their hosts cheaply on the first day and were already well in the lead, they had plenty of time to complete a victory, so Hassett and Morris had no need to take undue risks and scored at a sedate pace. The following batsmen were unable to string together substantial partnerships and Australia ended at 389. When England batted again, Allan Watkins pulled Doug Ring to the leg side and straight into the hands of Hassett, who did not need to move from his position on the boundary, leaving England at 6/167. The home team were eventually out for 188 and Australia thus sealed the series 4–0 with an innings victory.

Later tour matches 

Seven matches remained on Bradman's quest to go through a tour of England without defeat. Hassett was rested as Australia defeated Kent by an innings. In the next match against the Gentlemen of England at Lord's, Hassett came to the crease at 2/221 after Brown was out for 121 and featured in a 110-run third-wicket partnership with Bradman, who then fell for 150. Miller came in and put on 157 with Hassett before being dismissed for 69 on the second day. Australia eventually declared at 5/610 when Hassett reached 200 not out against a team that featured eight Test players. Australia went on to win by an innings after enforcing the follow on. Bradman then rested himself and Hassett led Australia against Somerset. Hassett decided to bat and came to the crease when Brown was run out before Australia had scored a single run. On his 35th birthday, he made 103 and was the next batsman to fall at 2/256, after a second-wicket partnership with Barnes, who retired ill on 42, and Harvey, who went on to make 126. This ended a partnership of 187 in only 110 minutes with Harvey. Australia declared on 5/560 at the end of the first day. Hassett enforced the follow on as Australia went on to win by an innings and 374 runs, skittling the hosts for 115 and 71. Hassett made it three centuries in a row against the South of England. He came in at 2/49 to join Bradman and the pair added 188 for the third wicket before the captain fell for 143 with the total at 3/237. Hassett then put on 175 with Harvey before the latter was out for 110 at 4/412. This ended a partnership of 175 in only 110 minutes. He was eventually out for the top score of 151 while attempting a big hit, leaving the score at 6/446, having anchored the tourists' innings. Australia declared at 7/522 and bowled out the hosts for 298 when rain ended the match. Hassett bowled six wicketless overs and conceded 28 runs in South's only innings.

Australia's biggest challenge in the post-Test tour matches was against the H. D. G. Leveson-Gower's XI. During the last tour in 1938, this team was effectively a full-strength England outfit, but on this occasion Bradman insisted that only six current English Test players be allowed to participate. Bradman then fielded a full-strength team, with the only difference from the Fifth Test team being the inclusion of Ian Johnson at the expense of Doug Ring. The bowlers skittled the hosts for 177, and Hassett came in at No.10 and made an unbeaten seven as Australia declared at 8/469. The hosts were 2/75 when the match ended in a draw after multiple rain delays. It was the tourists' last first-class match for the tour and when it became obvious that they would not lose, Bradman let Hassett bowl four overs for twelve runs without taking a wicket. The tour ended with two non-first-class matches against Scotland. Hassett missed both matches; Australia won both by an innings.

Role 

Aside from being the vice-captain, Hassett was one of three on-tour selectors along with Bradman and Morris. As matches often started the day after the previous fixture, Australia employed a rotation policy and Hassett led the tourists in nine tour matches while Bradman was rested. Under Hassett's watch, Australia won seven matches, five of these by an innings, while both draws were rain-affected fixtures in which more than half the playing time was lost. Hassett had two close encounters as captain, both on damp pitches before the First Test. Against Yorkshire, Australia scraped home by four wickets with ten men after Sam Loxton was injured in a low-scoring match. In a later game against Hampshire, Australia ceded a first innings lead for the first time on tour after a middle-order collapse, but recovered to win by eight wickets. The matches against Cambridge University, Oxford University, Northamptonshire, Gloucestershire and Somerset were won by an innings. The wins over the latter two were particularly convincing; Australia amassed its largest score for the tour against Gloucestershire, making 7/774 declared before winning by an innings and 363 runs. After the Tests, Australia compiled 5/560 against Somerset and won by an innings and 374 runs in less than two days. The matches against Durham and Glamorgan were washed out, with at least half the playing time lost.

A right-handed batsman, Hassett played in all five Tests; he batted in the middle-order in all but the Fourth Test at Headingley, when he opened due to an injury to Sid Barnes. Aside from the Headingley Test, Hassett batted at No.4 after Morris, Barnes and Bradman and in front of Keith Miller, except in the first innings of the series when he batted at No.6 and made 137. Hassett scored 310 runs at 44.28, placing him fourth in the Australian aggregates, but only seventh in the averages. He took six catches and did not bowl during the Tests.

Hassett ended the first-class tour with 1,563 runs at 74.22 with seven first-class centuries. He had the third highest aggregate behind Bradman and Morris and the second highest average. His highest score was an unbeaten 200 against the Gentlemen of England. In his 27 first-class innings, Hassett batted at Nos.3, 4,and5 21 times. Aside from the three instances in which he batted outside these positions in the Tests, Hassett made 139 while opening in the second match against Surrey in place of the injured Bill Brown, and 35 and seven not out against Worcestershire and Leveson-Gower's XI, batting at No.7 and No.10 respectively. N- An occasional medium pacer, Hassett delivered 12 overs—none in Tests—without taking a wicket. He took 23 catches, the most by an Australian (excluding wicket-keepers).

In recognition of his performances, Hassett was named as one of the five Wisden Cricketers of the Year in 1949. Wisden opined that "in addition to his playing ability Hassett's cheerfulness and leadership, which extended to off-the-field relaxation as well as in the more exacting part of the programme, combined to make him an ideal vice-captain able to lift a considerable load off Bradman's busy shoulders".

Notes

Statistical note

n-[1]

This statement can be verified by consulting all the scorecards for the matches, as listed here.

General notes

References 

 

The Invincibles (cricket)